The San Dimas Stage Race is a stage cycling race held annually in the San Gabriel Mountains in Southern California. It was called the Pomona Valley Stage Race until 2004.

Winners

Men

Women

References

Cycle races in the United States
Recurring sporting events established in 2000